Giancarlo Vitali (21 July 1926 — 27 October 2011) was an Italian football winger and later manager.

References

1926 births
2011 deaths
Italian footballers
Genoa C.F.C. players
Calcio Padova players
ACF Fiorentina players
S.S.C. Napoli players
S.P.A.L. players
U.S. Pistoiese 1921 players
U.S. Città di Pontedera players
Serie A players
Association football wingers
Italian football managers
Cosenza Calcio managers
Parma Calcio 1913 managers
A.S.D. Sorrento managers
U.S. Salernitana 1919 managers
Trapani Calcio managers